Dedicatoria is a 1980 Spanish drama film directed by Jaime Chávarri. It was entered into the 1980 Cannes Film Festival.

Cast
 Patricia Adriani
 María Amezua
 Francisco Casares
 José Luis Gómez
 Claude Legros
 Marie Mansart
 Amparo Muñoz
 Hélène Peychayrand
 Luis Politti
 Juan Jesús Valverde

References

External links

1980 films
1980s Spanish-language films
1980 drama films
Films directed by Jaime Chávarri
Spanish drama films
1980s Spanish films